KESD (88.3 FM) is a radio station licensed to Brookings, South Dakota. The station is owned by the South Dakota Bureau of Information and Telecommunication, and is an affiliate of South Dakota Public Broadcasting's radio network.

Translators

External links
 sdpb.org

ESD
NPR member stations
Brookings, South Dakota
Brookings County, South Dakota
Mitchell, South Dakota
Davison County, South Dakota
Mitchell, South Dakota micropolitan area
Mass media in the Mitchell, South Dakota micropolitan area